Wai Wai Aung (born 5 October 1993) is a Burmese footballer who plays as a defender for the Myanmar women's national team.

International goals

References

1993 births
Living people
Women's association football defenders
Burmese women's footballers
People from Bago Region
Myanmar women's international footballers